Guillermo Grigorio Krips (born 28 November 1929, died before 23 December 2016) was a Curaçaoan footballer. He competed in the men's tournament at the 1952 Summer Olympics.

References

External links
 
 

1929 births
Year of death missing
Curaçao footballers
Netherlands Antilles international footballers
Olympic footballers of the Netherlands Antilles
Footballers at the 1952 Summer Olympics
Place of birth missing
Association football forwards